An appeal to spite (Latin: argumentum ad odium) is a form of argumentation which attempts to win favor by exploiting feelings of bitterness, spite, or schadenfreude in the audience. Logically fallacious, it attempts to sway the audience emotionally by associating a widely hated figure or concept with the opposition's argument.

Appeal to spite is similar to ad hominem arguments which attack the speaker rather than addressing the claims, but in this case the ill feeling is not created by the argument, it already exists.

Examples 

 "Why shouldn't prisoners do hard labor? The places are full of scumbags!"
 "Stop that recycling! Aren't we tired of Hollywood celebrities preaching about saving the Earth?"
 "Why should they even have more? I got nothing from the state and look at what I had to give off to pay for my own studies!"
 "Not the opera, Hitler loved that, let's go to the circus instead."

References

Spite